Viktor Kalisch (4 December 1902 in Linz – 21 July 1976) was an Austrian sprint canoeist who competed in the late 1930s. He won a silver medal in the K-2 10000 m event at the 1936 Summer Olympics in Berlin.

References
DatabaseOlympics.com profile
Sports-reference.com profile

1902 births
1976 deaths
Austrian male canoeists
Olympic canoeists of Austria
Canoeists at the 1936 Summer Olympics
Olympic silver medalists for Austria
Olympic medalists in canoeing
Medalists at the 1936 Summer Olympics
Sportspeople from Linz